Agia Paraskevi Football Club, unofficially known as Santa (Athlitikos Omilos Agias Paraskevis) is a Greek association football club based in the city of Athens, Greece. Their home ground facilities are based in "Notou Street" at Agia Paraskevi of Athens, Greece. The club also has basketball, volleyball and futsal departments.

History
It is affectionally known as Santa or Agia and contains a strong rivalry with Nea Ionia F.C. “Santa-Fans” is a supporters fan group with more than 15 years history from Aghia Paraskevi.

In 1992, they won both the championship and the cup of the Athens Football Clubs Association.

In 1995, volleyball team was also created.

In 1996, team was create football futsal team.

In 2008, they promoted to Third Division, South Group.  They were ranked 15th during the 2010-11 season.

In 2009, SANTA's women's football team was also created.

Together with Rouf, it is the only team in Athens to have three cup titles.

Since 2013, the club is run by the American–Canadian of Greek descent entrepreneur, James Avgoustidis who wants to bring the team back to the top divisions.

Honours and achievements

Domestic competitions
Leagues:
 Delta Ethniki (FourthTier)
  Winners (1): 2007-08

Regional competitions
Leagues:
Athens FCA First Division
  Winners (3): 1992, 2004, 2022

Cups:
Athens FCA Cup
  Winners (3): 1992, 2005, 2008
  Runners-Up (1): 2018

See also
GS Agia Paraskevi
Basketball Agia Paraskevi

References

Association football clubs established in 1932
Football clubs in Attica
Agia Paraskevi